Bonwick Island is an island in the Broughton Archipelago in Central Coast region of British Columbia, Canada.  The archipelago is located on the northeast side of Queen Charlotte Strait and lies northwest of the Village of Alert Bay and immediately to the west of Gilford Island, separated from it by Retreat Pass.  Arrow Passage is on the island's northwest, separating it from Mars Island.

Features
Waddington Harbour at the head of Bute Inlet is also named for him.

Name origin
Bonwick Island was named by Captain Pender after Charles Bonwick, acting assistant engineer above the gunboat HMS ''Grappler in 1860, then as acting chief engineer on the survey ship Beaver from 1863.  He retired and was living in England by 1906.  The Bonwick Islands, now the Augustine Islands, Bonwick Point and Mount Bonwick were also named for him.

See also
List of islands of British Columbia

References

Islands of British Columbia
Central Coast of British Columbia